Giovanni Marinelli (18 October 1879 – 11 January 1944) was an Italian Fascist political leader.

Marinelli was born in Adria, Veneto.

A wealthy man, he contributed to Fascist success by financing the March on Rome. As secretary of the National Fascist Party (PNF), he created the  Ceka, a secret police established on the model of the Soviet Cheka. The Ceka soon established itself as a terrorist squad, and was behind the assassination of Giacomo Matteotti, a prominent member of the opposition to the Fascist régime.

Tried as instigator of the murder in November 1925, Marinelli was defended by Roberto Farinacci himself, and eventually sentenced to a light punishment. His close friendship with Benito Mussolini ensured that he did not serve the full term. He remained out of the spotlight during most of the next two decades of Fascist rule, and appears to have been involved in the crushing of internal opposition to Mussolini (including moves inside the PNF). He was elected to the Chamber of Deputies of the Kingdom of Italy in 1929 and in 1934, and from November 1939 to February 1943 he held the position of State Undersecretary for Communications.

As a member of the Grand Council of Fascism, on 25 July 1943 he joined the coup d'état carried out by Dino Grandi against Mussolini, as an attempt for Italy to switch sides in World War II (out of the alliance with Nazi Germany and into an agreement with the Allies). When the Nazis helped Mussolini re-establish his rule in Northern Italy, as leader of the Italian Social Republic, Marinelli was convicted of treason during the Verona trial of 1944, and executed by firing squad, along with former foreign minister Galeazzo Ciano, Emilio De Bono, Carlo Pareschi and Luciano Gottardi.

In Florestano Vancini's film The Assassination of Matteotti (1973), Marinelli is played by Orazio Stracuzzi.

References

1879 births
1944 deaths
Italian fascists
People from Adria
Executed politicians
Politicide perpetrators
People executed by Italy by firing squad
People executed by the Italian Social Republic
Executed Italian people